Jón Dagbjartur Jónsson (11 April 1908 - 2 August 1973) was an Icelandic water polo player and competition swimmer. He competed in the men's water polo tournament at the 1936 Summer Olympics.

Early life
Jón was born in Arnarfjörður in the Kingdom of Iceland on 11 April 1908.

Sports
Alongside playing Water polo, Jón was a competition swimmer in Iceland where he set several national records during the 1930s.

Death
On 2 August 1973, Jón fell from a roof he was painting. He was transported to a hospital were he died shortly later from his injuries.

References

External links
Jón Jónsson Olympic Results at Sports Reference

1908 births
1973 deaths
Icelandic male water polo players
Icelandic male swimmers
Olympic water polo players of Iceland
Water polo players at the 1936 Summer Olympics